The 1936 Ball State Cardinals football team was an American football team that represented Ball State Teachers College (later renamed Ball State University) in the Indiana Intercollegiate Conference (IIC) during the 1936 college football season. In their second season under head coach John Magnabosco, the Cardinals compiled a 3–4–1 record (3–3–1 against IIC opponents), finished in eighth place out of 15 teams in the IIC, and outscored opponents by a total of 78 to 55. The team played its home games at Ball State Athletic Field in Muncie, Indiana.

Schedule

References

Ball State
Ball State Cardinals football seasons
Ball State Cardinals football